Chanderkote is a village panchayat located in the Ramban district of Jammu-Kashmir, India. This Highway village located on the left bank of River Chenab is just 8 km away from District Headquarters and Nearly 125 km from both State capitals  Jammu and Sringar.  Also Chanderkote sharing its boundaries on South- East side with Kunfer panchayat  another village on the bank of river chenab acts as  gateway to Chanderkote when you enter Chanderkote from Southern side on your way towards Srinagar NH44 four lane by pass stretch also passes through Kunfer village. The most common language spoken in the region is Dogri, Urdu, Shina, Hindi, Gujjari, Sarazi, Punjabi and English being other familiar languages.

Educational institutions 
There are various Government and private schools in Chanderkote

1.Government High school chanderkote

Govt. HS Chanderkote was established in 1951 and it is managed by the Department of Education.

2.Kamal Academy High school Chanderkote

Kamal Academy (HS) was established in 1987 and it is managed by the Pvt. Unaided. English is the medium of instructions in this school. This school is approachable by all weather road. Its one of the best Private institute in Chanderkote.

3. Govt. KGBV Chanderkote

Govt. KGBV Chanderkote was established in 2009 and it is managed by the Department of Education. The school is Kasturba Gandhi Balika Vidhyalaya (KGBV).

4. Era international convent

5.New Presentation Convent Institute

There are many other government primary schools like Middle primary school chanderkote, PS Kunfer, PS Magdan, PS Bass, PS Thanadi.

Government Degree College Ramban is just 3 km from chanderkote and located at Karol. Besides this there is also Government Polytechnic college at Chanderkote which is under construction.

Transport

Road 

Chanderkote is well-connected by road to other places in Jammu and Kashmir and India by the NH 44.

Rail 
Chanderkote is not connected with railways. The nearest railway station is Udhampur railway station located at a distance of 45 kilometres.

Air 
The nearest airport is Jammu Airport and Srinagar airport located at a distance of 125 kilometres.

Places

Gajpat Fort 
There is an important fort known as Gajpat Fort, on the top of mountain. It is said that once Sheikh Abdullah was kept imprisoned in this fort for few days. In 1825, Gulab Singh had imprisoned Raja Sultan Khan of Bimbar in this fort. Sultan Khan died there and was buried at Chanderkote. In 1858 Mean Hathu Singh, the Governor of Rajouri and a closed relatives of Maharaja had revolted against State Government and tried to kill Maharaja Ranbir Singh. Mean Hathu was arrested and shifted to Gajpat fort.

Imambara 
Imambara is a major religious place for the Shi’ate Muslims of the Chanderkote.

Apart from this the important places are

 Jamia masjid chanderkote 
 Shiv khoo (cave)
 Dargha Hazrat Abbas ع
 Durga mandir
Amarnath yatri Niwas

See also 
Baglihar Dam
Nashri chenani tunnel
Patnitop
Sanasar
Qalbi bhai

References 

Villages in Ramban district